Faith in the Future may refer to:

 Faith in the Future (TV series), a British TV series that aired on ITV from 1995 to 1998
 Faith in the Future (Craig Finn album), released in 2015
 Faith in the Future (Louis Tomlinson album), released in 2022